

See also 
 United States House of Representatives elections, 1788 and 1789
 List of United States representatives from Connecticut

References 

1788
Connecticut
United States House of Representatives